The Zilber Family Foundation is a Milwaukee, Wisconsin based foundation that was founded in 2009.

History
"Formed in 1961, the Joseph and Vera Zilber Family Foundation, Inc. is a private, independent grantmaking institution dedicated to enhancing the well being of individuals, families, and neighborhoods."

Governance
 Susan Lloyd, executive director
 Marcy Zilber Jackson, president
 James Janz, Vice-President
 Steve Chevalier, Secretary-Treasurer
 Melissa S. A. Jackson	 
 Shane Jackson	 
 Marilyn Zilber	 
 John K. Tsui

Grantees
These are among the grants awarded:
 2015, a grant to Neighborhood House for iPads and headsets for Burmese students to use
 2015, $300,000 to the organization MKE Plays to "transform deteriorated playgrounds and turn them into models of public and private collaboration."
 2015, the Zilber Neighborhood Initiative, a $50 million grant making program to improve neighborhoods in Milwaukee
 2014, $400,000 to the University of Wisconsin-Milwaukee's Joseph J. Zilber School of Public Health to establish a Vera Zilber Public Health Scholars program
 2014, a five-year, $25,000 grant to continue its support of Ronald Reagan International Baccalaureate (IB) High School's music program
 2014, a $100,000 grant to Neu-Life Community Development

See also
 Argosy Foundation
 Bader Philanthropies
 Bradley Foundation

References

 http://urbanmilwaukee.com/2015/03/24/helping-police-build-neighborhoods/
 http://urbanmilwaukee.com/pressrelease/zilber-family-foundation-awards-25000-to-ronald-reagan-ib-high-school-music-department/
 http://communityjournal.net/zilber-family-foundation-awards-100000-neu-life-community-development-support-capital-improvements-remodeling-lindsay-heights-location/

External links
 http://www.zilberfamilyfoundation.org
 http://www.znimilwaukee.org

Foundations based in the United States
Organizations based in Milwaukee
1961 establishments in Wisconsin